"Runnin' for the Red Light (I Gotta Life)" is a song composed and written by Harry Vanda, George Young, Patti Russo, Sarah Durkee, and Meat Loaf. The song's chorus is lifted from INXS and Jimmy Barnes' cover of "Good Times" by Australian rock band the Easybeats, so Easybeats members Harry Vanda and George Young are credited as writers.

The song was released on April 15, 1996, as the third single from Meat Loaf's seventh studio album, Welcome to the Neighborhood (1995), reaching number 21 on the UK Singles Chart and number two on the UK Rock and Metal Singles Chart. Meat Loaf did not perform this song live until the Mad, Mad World Tour in 2012.

Tracks
The single was released in two versions, a CD maxi single and a 12-inch picture disc. The CD contains the album version of the song and live versions of "Life Is a Lemon and I Want My Money Back", "Amnesty is Granted" and "Dead Ringer for Love". On the 12-inch, "Amnesty is Granted" was replaced by "Midnight at the Lost and Found".

Charts

References

1995 singles
1995 songs
Meat Loaf songs
Song recordings produced by Ron Nevison
Songs written by George Young (rock musician)
Songs written by Harry Vanda